Fabio Ruíz (born 7 August 1927) is a Cuban former basketball player. He competed in the men's tournament at the 1948 Summer Olympics and the 1952 Summer Olympics.

References

External links
 

1927 births
Possibly living people
Cuban men's basketball players
Olympic basketball players of Cuba
Basketball players at the 1948 Summer Olympics
Basketball players at the 1952 Summer Olympics
Basketball players from Havana